Kate Davis is an American director, producer and editor. She is best known for Southern Comfort (2001), and Traffic Stop (2017) for which she received Academy Award for Best Documentary Short Subject nomination with husband David at the 90th Academy Awards. More recently she and her husband, David Heilbroner, directed Say Her Name, a documentary about the life and death of Sandra Bland.

Filmography
 2018: Say Her Name: The Life and Death of Sandra Bland (Documentary)
 2017: Traffic Stop (Documentary short) 
 2014: The Newburgh Sting (Documentary) 
 2013: The Cheshire Murders (TV Movie documentary) 
 2011: American Experience (TV Series documentary) (1 episode) 
 2010: Stonewall Uprising (Documentary) 
 2009: Waiting for Armageddon (Documentary) 
 2007: Addiction (TV Movie documentary) (segment "The Adolescent Addict") 
 2007: The Addiction Project (TV Series) (1 episode) 
 2006: Plastic Disasters (TV Movie documentary) 
 2006: Ten Days That Unexpectedly Changed America''' (TV Series documentary) (1 episode) 
 2005: Pucker Up (Documentary) 
 2004: Jockey (Documentary) 
 2001: Southern Comfort (Documentary) 
 1990: A World Alive (Documentary) 
 1987: Girltalk (Documentary) 
 1983: America Undercover'' (TV Series documentary) (episode "Southern Comfort", episode "Jockey")

References

External links
 Kate Davis at CineDigm 
 

Living people
1960s births
People from Boston
Film producers from Massachusetts
American women film directors
American film editors
Film directors from Massachusetts
American women film producers
American women film editors
21st-century American women